HTPP may refer to:

Hrazdan Thermal Power Plant, a power plant in Armenia
Hypertext Printing Protocol, a precursor of the Internet Printing Protocol

See also 
 HTTP, the Hypertext Transfer Protocol